United Nations Security Council Resolution 157, adopted on September 17, 1960, after a discussion of the Congo Crisis lead to a lack of unanimity of its permanent members and thus prevented it from exercising its primary responsibility for the maintenance of international peace and security, the Council decided to call an emergency special session of the General Assembly to make appropriate recommendations.

Resolution 157 was adopted with eight votes to two (People's Republic of Poland and the Soviet Union) and one abstention from France.

See also
List of United Nations Security Council Resolutions 101 to 200 (1953–1965)
Resolutions 143, 145, 146, 161 and 169
The Congo Crisis

References
Text of the Resolution at undocs.org

External links
 

 0157
 0157
 0157
1960 in the Republic of the Congo (Léopoldville)
1960 in Belgium
September 1960 events